The Air Force of Serbia and Montenegro (RVSiCG) , also known as the Air Force of Yugoslavia (JRV) from 1992 to 2003, was the air force of the former Serbia and Montenegro. It had around 300 fighter aircraft, ground attack aircraft, and other aircraft. The air force, in 1998, had about 16,000 personnel. The air force was disbanded when Montenegro voted to secede from the ex-FRY in 2006. The bulk of it was inherited by the Serbian Air Force and Air Defence.

History

Creation and consolidation

Reorganization

Operation Allied Force
Around 50 Yugoslav aircraft were lost during the Kosovo War when NATO aircraft attacked FRY forces in 1999. Six MiG-29s were destroyed in dogfights against F-15s, F-16s, and F-18s. Other MiG-29s were destroyed on the ground when NATO forces attacked the FRY's Batajnica Airfield.

Casualties
The commander-in-chief of the Air Force said that Air Force and Air Defense had 40 killed and 110 wounded personnel in combat.

Air Force and Air Defense used innovative tactics to counter technologically more advanced and numerically superior opponents.
AF & AD C-in-C Lieutenant General Spasoje Smiljanić was promoted to the rank of Colonel General and awarded Medal of War Flag - First Degree.
Deputy of C-in-C Supreme Command Headquarters for the AF Colonel General Ljubiša Veličković was awarded the Medal of War Flag - First Degree. General Veličković was killed in combat.

Air combat

The first Yugoslav planes in the air were the Knights of the 127th LAE (127th Fighter Squadron) with their MiG-29s (they were the only unit operating them). Based on publicly released data one could conclude that three MiGs were scrambled from Batajnica Air Base with Lieutenant Colonel Ljubiša Kulačin, Major Nebojša Nikolić and Major Milorad Milutinović in the cockpits and two (Lieutenant Colonel Dragan Ilić, Major Iljo Arizanov) from Niš Airport. Since Germany had the same type of MiG-29 for a decade, NATO was expected to be successful in jamming radar and communication with GC center. Bearing that in mind and the fact that great numbers of enemy aircraft were in the air backed by four AWACS planes, Yugoslav pilots applied new tactics. They abandoned the usual leader-wingman formations and used fast solo dashes near ground to stay out of sight and then, when close enough to fire their R-73s (AA-11 Archer air-to-air missiles), engage in a vertical climb trying to get a firing solution with their KOLS laser - IR rangefinder/homing system.

The following pilots were awarded Bravery Medals and promoted to higher ranks:
 Major Nebojsa Nikolić
 Major Slobodan Perić (killed in car accident 30 May 2010)
 Major Predrag Milutinović
 Major Iljo Arizanov
 Captain, 1st class Zoran Radosavljević, killed in combat

Other pilots that flew combat missions (based on data gathered so far):
 Colonel General Ljubiša Veličković
 Colonel Milenko Pavlovic, commander of 204. Fighter Aviation Regiment, killed in combat
 Lieutenant Colonel Ljubiša Kulačin
 Lieutenant Colonel Dragan Ilić
 Major Abdul Emeti
 Major Bora Zoraja
 Major Dragan Milenković

List of awarded units
250. Rocket Brigade AD received the Order of the National Hero medal, the highest military medal for their exceptional service during the war.

126. VOJIN Brigade received the Order of the National Hero medal, the highest military medal for their exceptional service during the war.

List of awarded members
 Lieutenant Colonel Zivota Duric, Bravery Medal and promotion to higher rank. He was killed in combat when he tried to ram enemy aircraft with his badly damaged J-22 Orao.
 Colonel Kis Bela, Bravery Medal
 Colonel Ostojic Goran, Bravery Medal
 Lieutenant Colonel Sreto Malinovic, Medal of Honor
 Major Vukicevic Srđan, Bravery Medal
 Major Milenkovic Sava, Bravery Medal
 Major Nikcevic Rade, Bravery Medal
 Major Milovanovic Aleksa and Captain, 1st class Jovanovic Srđan got Distinguished Service Medal's for rescuing downed pilot under enemy fire
 Captain, 1st class Abrt Emilijan, Bravery Medal
 Captain, 1st class Mrvljevic Nebojsa, Bravery Medal
 Captain Bulatovic Nenad, Bravery Medal
 Captain Spasic Nenad, Bravery Medal
 Senior Sergeant, 1st class Vukovic Dragan, Bravery Medal
 Sergeant, 1st class Aksic Milos, Bravery Medal
 Sergeant, 1st class Komazec Zdravko, Bravery Medal
 Sergeant, 1st class Djurcic Dragan, Bravery Medal

List of destroyed aircraft

Organization

Structure

1992–1994
Air Force and Air Defense Command
333rd Engineering Battalion
322nd Signal Battalion
138th Transport Aviation Brigade
280th Center for Electronic Reconnaissance and Jamming
Flight Test Center
Aviation Corps
83rd Aviation Brigade
172nd Aviation Brigade
204th Aviation Brigade
98th Fighter-Bomber Aviation Regiment
97th Helicopter Regiment
119th Helicopter Regiment
Air Defense Corps
210th Signal Battalion
126th Air Surveillance/Intelligence and Guidance Brigade
250th Air Defense Missile Brigade
450th Air Defense Missile Brigade
60th Air Defense Self-Propelled Missile Regiment
230th Air Defense Self-Propelled Missile Regiment
240th Air Defense Self-Propelled Missile Regiment
310th Air Defense Self-Propelled Missile Regiment
311th Air Defense Self-Propelled Missile Regiment

1994–1996
Air Force and Air Defense Command
138th Transport Aviation Brigade
280th Center for Electronic Reconnaissance and Jamming
Flight Test Center
Aviation Corps
333rd Engineering Battalion
172nd Aviation Brigade
98th Aviation Brigade
119th Helicopter Regiment
Air Defense Corps
359th Engineering Battalion
210th Signal Battalion
83rd Fighter Aviation Regiment
204th Fighter Aviation Regiment
126th Air Surveillance/Intelligence and Guidance Brigade
250th Air Defense Missile Brigade
450th Air Defense Missile Regiment
60th Air Defense Self-Propelled Missile Regiment
230th Air Defense Self-Propelled Missile Regiment
240th Air Defense Self-Propelled Missile Regiment
310th Air Defense Self-Propelled Missile Regiment
311th Air Defense Self-Propelled Missile Regiment

1996–1999
Air Force and Air Defense Command
 353rd Reconnaissance Aviation Squadron "Sokolovi"
 677th Transport Aviation Squadron "Rode"
 890th Mixed Helicopter Squadron "Pegazi"
 280th Center for Electronic Reconnaissance and Jamming
 Flight Test Center
 Aviation Corps
333rd Engineering Battalion
 172nd Aviation Brigade
 98th Fighter-Bomber Aviation Regiment
 119th Helicopter Brigade
 Air Defense Corps
 359th Engineering Battalion
 210th Signal Battalion
 83rd Fighter Aviation Regiment
 204th Fighter Aviation Regiment
 126th Air Surveillance/Intelligence and Guidance Brigade
 250th Air Defense Missile Brigade
 450th Air Defense Missile Regiment
 60th Air Defense Self-Propelled Missile Regiment
 230th Air Defense Self-Propelled Missile Regiment
 240th Air Defense Self-Propelled Missile Regiment
 310th Air Defense Self-Propelled Missile Regiment
311th Air Defense Self-Propelled Missile Regiment

1999–2002
Air Force and Air Defense Command
 353rd Reconnaissance Aviation Squadron "Sokolovi"
 677th Transport Aviation Squadron "Rode"
 890th Mixed Helicopter Squadron "Pegazi"
 280th Center for Electronic Reconnaissance and Jamming
 Flight Test Center
 Aviation Corps
333rd Engineering Battalion
 172nd Aviation Brigade
 98th Fighter-Bomber Aviation Regiment
 119th Helicopter Brigade
 Air Defense Corps
 359th Engineering Battalion
 210th Signal Battalion
 204th Fighter Aviation Regiment
 126th Air Surveillance/Intelligence and Guidance Brigade
 250th Air Defense Missile Brigade
 450th Air Defense Missile Regiment
 60th Air Defense Self-Propelled Missile Regiment
 230th Air Defense Self-Propelled Missile Regiment
 240th Air Defense Self-Propelled Missile Regiment
 310th Air Defense Self-Propelled Missile Regiment

2002–2006
Air Force and Air Defense Command
 353rd Reconnaissance Aviation Squadron "Sokolovi"
 677th Transport Aviation Squadron "Rode"
 890th Mixed Helicopter Squadron "Pegazi"
 280th Center for Electronic Reconnaissance and Jamming
 Flight Test Center
 Aviation Corps
333rd Engineering Battalion
 172nd Aviation Brigade
 98th Fighter-Bomber Aviation Regiment
 119th Helicopter Brigade
 Air Defense Corps
 359th Engineering Battalion
 210th Signal Battalion
 204th Fighter Aviation Regiment
 126th Air Surveillance/Intelligence and Guidance Brigade
 250th Air Defense Missile Brigade
 230th Air Defense Self-Propelled Missile Regiment
 240th Air Defense Self-Propelled Missile Regiment
 310th Air Defense Self-Propelled Missile Regiment

Branches and services

Ranks of the RV i PVO SRJ/SCG

Inventory

Successors 
The successors are the Serbian Air Force and the Montenegrin Air Force.

References 

Military units and formations established in 1992
Military units and formations disestablished in 2006
Military of Serbia and Montenegro
Disbanded air forces